The Christchurch Country by-election 1856 was a by-election held in the multi-member  electorate during the 2nd New Zealand Parliament, on 14 October 1856,  and was, along with the Grey and Bell , the second equal contested by-election in New Zealand political history.

The by-election was caused by the resignation of incumbent MP Dingley Brittin on 7 July 1856.

The election was won by John Ollivier. On nomination day (13 October) Ollivier and Crosbie Ward were nominated, and after a show of hands in favour of Ollivier, Ward demanded a poll. Ollivier was subsequently elected the following day.

Results

References

Christchurch Country 1856
1856 elections in New Zealand
1850s in Christchurch
Politics of Christchurch